Federico Falco is an Argentinian writer born in 1977. He holds a BA in communications from Blas Pascal University in Argentina and an MFA in creative writing in Spanish from New York University.

In 2004, he was given the Young Writers Award by the Spanish Cultural Centre of Córdoba, Argentina.
In 2005, he received a grant for improvement from the National Trust for the Arts of Argentina, and in 2009, a scholarship from New York University and the Banco Santander Foundation.

In 2010 Federico Falco was selected as one of The Best of Young Spanish Language Novelists by the Granta Magazine.

In 2012, he participated in the International Writing Program's Fall Residency at the University of Iowa in Iowa City, IA.

Bibliography
Short Stories
 222 patitos, Editorial La Creciente, 2004.
 00, Alción Editora, 2004.
 La hora de los monos, Emecé 2010.
Novels
 "Cielos de Córdoba", Editorial Nudista. 2011
Poetry books
 Aeropuertos, aviones, Ediciones ¿Qué vamos a hacer hasta las seis?, 2006.
 Made in China, Ediciones Recovecos, 2008.
Theatre
 Diosa de Barrio, Editorial La propia cartonera, 2010.

References

External links
 Interview in Three Percent
 Brief presentation in Granta Magazine
 Interview (in Spanish).
 Elefantes, short story (in Spanish).
 El hombre de los gatos, short story (in Spanish).
 Cuento de Navidad, short story (in Spanish).

Argentine male writers
Living people
International Writing Program alumni
Year of birth missing (living people)